The Diocese of Rorya is a northern diocese in the Anglican Church of Tanzania: its current bishop is the Rt Rev John Adiema.

Notes

Anglican Church of Tanzania dioceses
Mara Region
Anglican realignment dioceses